Yussef E'tesami (also known as, E'tesam-al-Molk, Mirza Yusuf E'tesami Ashtiani; 1874–1938), was an Iranian journalist, politician, publisher, translator, and writer. He was a member of the second Majles (from 1909 to 1912). His daughter was poet Parvin E'tesami.

Biography 
Yussef E'tesami was born in 1874. His father, Mīrzā Ebrāhīm Khan Mostawfī Eʿteṣām-al-Molk was from Ashtian and the head of finance of the Iranian province of Azerbaijan. He was the elder brother of the architect and painter Abolhassan E'tesami, and the father of the poet Parvin E'tesami.

In the 1890s, Yussef E'tesami established the first typographical printing house in Tabriz. He was a member of the Iranian Parliament or Majles in 1909–12, and founded the Bahar journal in 1910. At various junctures, he served in the Ministry of Education and headed the Royal and Majles Libraries.

The Bahar journal was a sixty-four-page monthly published in two periods; from April 1910– October 1911 and from April 1921–December 1922. As noted in the first issue, the purpose of Bahar was “to provide a … forum for various significant topics of scientific, literary, ethical, historical, and artistic interest to people of understanding, and to acquaint the public with valuable information.” Most of the journal's material was written or translated by Yussef E'tesami, and a large part devoted to Western culture. To Edward Granville Browne (1928, 489) Bahar appeared "very modern and European in tone;" and in Encyclopaedia Iranica, Heshmat Moayyad points out its "liberal and humanistic" orientation.

In addition to his contributions to Bahar, Yussef E'tesami's produced about forty volumes of translations, in particular some Persian translations of Qasim Amin's Tahrir al-Mara, Victor Hugo's Les Misérables, vol. 1, and Friedrich Schiller's Kabale und Liebe. He is the author also of a commentary in Arabic of Abolqassem al-Zamakhshari's Atwaq ad-Dahab, a three-volume catalog of manuscripts in the Majles Library.

He died on 2 January 1938 in Tehran.

References

Sources 

 Browne, Edward G. 1928. A literary history of Persia, vol. 4. Cambridge: Cambridge University Press.
 Dehkhoda, Ali-Akbar. 1977. Biographical note. In Poems of Parvin Etessami, ed. Abolfath Etessami, p. 342. Tehran: Abolfath Etessami.
 E'tesami, Abolhassan. 1958. Biographical note. Tehran University News Bulletin 374, pp. 34–7.

Iranian journalists
Iranian publishers (people)
Iranian translators
1874 births
1938 deaths
People from Tabriz
Iranian Esperantists
Members of the 2nd Iranian Majlis
Deputies of Tabriz for National Consultative Assembly
Deputies of Tehran for National Consultative Assembly
Members of the 3rd Iranian Majlis
People of Qajar Iran
Iranian magazine founders